Malik Ghulam Mohammad Raza Rabbani Khar is the youngest member of the National Assembly of Pakistan. He was elected from Muzaffargarh, South Punjab in the 2018 general elections at the age of 25. He belongs to the well known Khar family. He is the son of Malik Ghulam Rabbani Khar former Minister and Member of National and Provincial Assemblies and brother of Hina Rabbani Khar former Foreign Minister of Pakistan.

Political career
He was elected to the National Assembly of Pakistan from Constituency NA-183 (Muzaffargarh-III) as a candidate of Pakistan Peoples Party in 2018 Pakistani general election. He is also a Member of the Standing Committees on Energy, CPEC and Cabinet Division.

References

Living people
Pakistani MNAs 2018–2023
Pakistan People's Party MNAs
Malik Ghulam Raza
Year of birth missing (living people)
People from Muzaffargarh
Politicians from Muzaffargarh